7th NYFCCO Awards
December 9, 2007

Best Film: 
 The Diving Bell & the ButterflyThere Will Be Blood 
The 7th New York Film Critics Online Awards, honoring the best in filmmaking in 2007, were given on 9 December 2007.

Top 11 films
(in alphabetical order)
Atonement
Before the Devil Knows You're Dead
The Darjeeling Limited
The Diving Bell and the Butterfly (Le scaphandre et le papillon)
I'm Not There
Juno
Michael Clayton
No Country for Old Men
Persepolis
Sweeney Todd: The Demon Barber of Fleet Street
There Will Be Blood

Winners
Best Actor:
Daniel Day-Lewis - There Will Be Blood as Daniel Plainview
Best Actress:
Julie Christie - Away from Her as Fiona Anderson
Best Animated Film:
Persepolis
Best Breakthrough Performance:
Elliot Page - Juno
Best Cast:
Before the Devil Knows You're Dead
Best Cinematography:
There Will Be Blood - Robert Elswit
Best Debut Director:
Sarah Polley - Away from Her
Best Director:
Paul Thomas Anderson - There Will Be Blood
Best Documentary Film:
Sicko
Best Film: (tie)
The Diving Bell and the Butterfly (Le scaphandre et le papillon)
There Will Be Blood
Best Film Score:
There Will Be Blood - Jonny Greenwood
Best Foreign Language Film:
The Lives of Others (Das Leben der Anderen) • Germany
Persepolis • France
Best Screenplay:
The Darjeeling Limited - Wes Anderson, Jason Schwartzman & Roman Coppola
Best Supporting Actor:
Javier Bardem - No Country for Old Men as Anton Chigurh
Best Supporting Actress:
Cate Blanchett - I'm Not There as Jude Quinn/Bob Dylan

Notes

References

New York Film Critics Online Awards
2007 film awards
2007 in American cinema